Spring Is Here is a 1930 American Pre-Code musical comedy film produced by First National Pictures and distributed by Warner Bros. It was adapted by James A. Starr from the 1929 musical play, of the same name, by Owen Davis, with music by Richard Rodgers and Lorenz Hart. The film stars Lawrence Gray, Alexander Gray, and Bernice Claire.

An abridged version of the film was released in 1933 as the musical short Yours Sincerely.

Plot

Bernice Claire is in love with Lawrence Gray. Claire's father, played by Ford Sterling, disapproves of Lawrence but approves another suitor, played by Alexander Gray. Alexander is shy and clumsy while Lawrence is outgoing and romantic. When Bernice returns one night at 5 a.m. with Lawrence, her father orders him to stay away from his daughter. Alexander, being discouraged at being rejected by Bernice, is offered help by Inez Courtney, Bernice's younger sister. Alexander follows her advice and attempts to make Bernice jealous to get her attention. He makes love to several women, including Bernice's mother. The trick works and soon Bernice thinks she is deeply in love with Alexander. Sterling gets into an argument with Lawrence and tells him to leave his house for good. Lawrence returns in the middle of the night to elope with Bernice but Alexander shows up and carries her off for himself. In the morning they are found together in Bernice's room, to the shock of the family, and they eventually reveal to everyone that they have eloped.

Cast
 Lawrence Gray as Steve Alden 
 Bernice Claire as Betty Braley
 Alexander Gray as Terry Clayton 
 Louise Fazenda as Emily Braley
 Ford Sterling as Peter Braley
 Inez Courtney as Mary Jane Braley
 Frank Albertson as Stacy Adams
 Natalie Moorhead as Mrs. Rita Conway 
 Brox Sisters as Singing Trio

Songs
 "Spring Is Here (in Person)" - Performed by Frank Albertson and Inez Courtney
 "Yours Sincerely" - Performed by Alexander Gray and Bernice Claire
 "With a Song in My Heart" - Performed by Lawrence Gray and Bernice Claire
 "Bad Baby" - Performed by Inez Courtney
 "Cryin' for the Carolines" - Performed by the Brox Sisters
 "Have a Little Faith in Me" - Performed by Alexander Gray and Bernice Claire
 "How Shall I Tell?" - Performed by Bernice Claire
 "What's the Big Idea?" - Performed by Frank Albertson and Inez Courtney (vocal and dance)
 "With a Song in My Heart" - Reprised by Alexander Gray and Bernice Claire

Preservation status
The film survives intact and has been aired on broadcast and cable television.

References

External links
 
 
 
 
 

1930 films
1930 musical comedy films
American musical comedy films
Films based on musicals
First National Pictures films
American black-and-white films
Films directed by John Francis Dillon
1930s English-language films
1930s American films